Islin was a Palestinian Arab village located 21 kilometers west of Jerusalem. The village had a population of 302 inhabitants and was depopulated during the 1948 Arab-Israeli war. It was occupied by Israeli forces, possibly from the Fourth Battalion of the Harel Brigade, on 18 July 1948 during Operation Dani, causing its inhabitants to leave. Eshtaol, a moshav, was built on the village's land.

History
In 1596, Islin appeared  as Islit in Ottoman tax registers as being in the Nahiya of Ramla of the Liwa of Jaffa.  It had a population of 14 Muslim households, an estimated 77 people, who paid a fixed tax-rate of 25% on agricultural products, including  wheat, barley, and goats or beehives; a total of 4,700  akçe.

In the later 1870s the place was uninhabited, with ruins of a village still visible, and with a Mukam. It was probably re-established at the beginning of the century.

British Mandate era
In the 1922 census of Palestine, conducted by the British Mandate authorities,  Islin had a population 132,  all  Muslims, increasing  in the 1931 census   to 186;  in a total of  40 houses.

In the 1945 statistics the population was 260, all Muslims, while the total land area was 2,159  dunams, according to an official land and population survey. Of this,  104 were allocated  for plantations and irrigable land, 830 for cereals, while 20 dunams were classified as built-up areas.

1948 Arab–Israeli War and after
Islin, along with four other villages, were overtaken by the Israeli Harel Brigade on 17–18 July 1948 in Operation Dani. The villages had been on the front line since April 1948 and most of the inhabitants of these villages had already left the area. Many of those who stayed fled when Israeli forces attacked and the few who remained at each village were expelled.

Of the site in 1992, Walid Khalidi writes: "Partially destroyed walls and stone terraces can be seen throughout the site. A thick forest, bushes, and grass grow over and around the stone rubble. Many carob trees and some olive trees grow on the northern edge of the site, and eucalyptus and fir trees grow in the south. The site also houses a bus repair yard belonging to the Israeli public transportation cooperative, Egged."

See also
Depopulated Palestinian locations in Israel
List of villages depopulated during the Arab-Israeli conflict

References

Bibliography

External links
Welcome To 'Islin
'Islin, Zochrot
Survey of Western Palestine, Map 17:    IAA, Wikimedia commons 
'Islin, from the Khalil Sakakini Cultural Center

Arab villages depopulated during the 1948 Arab–Israeli War
District of Jerusalem